"Shot Clock" is a song by English singer Ella Mai from her eponymous debut studio album. The song peaked at number 62 on the Billboard Hot 100. The song was written by Mai, Micah, Aubrey Graham, Dijon McFarlane, Jahron Brathwaite, Quentin Miller, Benjamin Bush, Stephen Garrett and Timothy Mosley and features production by DJ Mustard.

Music video
An accompanying music video for the song premiered via Mai's Vevo channel on 17 January 2019

Charts

Weekly charts

Year-end charts

Certifications

Release history

References

2018 songs
2019 singles
Ella Mai songs
Songs written by Mustard (record producer)
Song recordings produced by Mustard (record producer)
Songs written by Drake (musician)
Songs written by PartyNextDoor
Songs written by Static Major
Songs written by Timbaland
Songs written by Ella Mai